Enercon GmbH is a wind turbine manufacturer based in Aurich, Lower Saxony, Germany. It has been the market leader in Germany since the mid-1990s. Enercon has production facilities in Germany (Aurich, Emden and Magdeburg), Brazil, India, Canada, Turkey and Portugal. In June 2010, Enercon announced that they would be setting up Irish headquarters in Tralee.

, Enercon had installed more than 26,300 wind turbines, with a power generating capacity exceeding 43 GW. The most-often installed model is the E-40, which pioneered the gearbox-less design in 1993. As of July 2011, Enercon has a market share of 7.2% world-wide (fifth-highest) and 59.2% in Germany.

Technologies
Enercon wind turbines have some special technical features compared to turbines of most other manufacturers. Characteristic is the gearless propulsion concept, which Enercon pioneered since 1993. The first generation of gearless turbines was the E-40/500 kW series. (Earlier Enercon designs had a transmission train.) The hub with the rotor blades connects directly to the rotor of the ring generator (direct drive). The rotor unit rotates on a front and rear main bearing about a fixed axis. The speed of the rotor is transmitted directly to the high-pole synchronous generator, where the rotor rotates in the stator, differently. The Enercon generator has no permanent magnets, allowing the company to not rely on rare-earth metals. However, the direct connection also causes grid losses. Rotation speed and the mechanical load changes over the service life are lower than geared systems. Rotation speed varies from 18 to 45 revolutions per minute (RPM) for the E-33 and 5-11.7 RPM for the E-126 depending on wind speed, while a geared generator has a speed of about 1500 RPM at rated power. Thus the large Enercon generators lead to high tower head masses, and construction and logistical challenges. In 2022, the first integrated box-shaped nacelles with inverter and transformer reduced logistics - all previous Enercon turbines had power systems in the tower base.

Most Enercon systems are visually distinct from systems of other manufacturers. Their nacelles have been drop-shaped since 1995/1996. This unique design was developed by British architect Norman Foster, who also designed the dome of the Berlin Reichstag. In Germany and many other countries, the tower has coloured green rings above the foundation, which get brighter from bottom to top. On islands such as Borkum, the gradation is blue. The NCS grading is intended to better integrate the plant towers into the horizon. The rotor blades were the only ones on the market with blade tips similar to the winglets on aircraft.

In 2008, the first E-126 turbines (successor of the E-112) were installed at sites throughout Germany and Belgium, including the Estinnes wind farm (consisting of eleven E-126 turbines) in Belgium. Although the E-126 turbine was initially developed with a power rating of 6 MW, it has since been upgraded to 7.5 MW. The E-82 turbine was also upgraded and is available in 2, 2.3, and 3 MW versions.

Currently Enercon does not offer or supply wind turbines to offshore projects and has at times expressed skepticism about offshore wind parks. Enercon was rumored to have been ready to supply turbines to Germany's Alpha Ventus offshore wind farm and to a near-shore park near Wilhelmshaven but did not do so.

Turbines
Note: wind turbine designations with a "*" mean the turbine either temporarily unavailable, or has been taken off sale permanently.

Issues

Patent dispute
In a dispute before the United States International Trade Commission, Enercon did not challenge the validity of the US patent but argued that their technology was not affected. The ITC decided that the patent covered the technology in question and banned Enercon turbines from the US market until 2010. Later, a cross patent agreement was made with the competitor General Electric, the successor of Kenetech, after similar claims of Enercon against GE. According to a NSA employee detailed information concerning Enercon was passed on to Kenetech via ECHELON. The aim of the alleged industrial espionage against Enercon was the forwarding of details of Wobben's generator technology to a US firm.

Other ventures
From 2008 to 2020, Enercon was part owner of a railway company, that among other things owns the Abelitz–Aurich railway, (via :de:Eisenbahninfrastrukturgesellschaft Aurich-Emden) which is used to deliver wind turbine blades made by Enercon via rail to customers. During the time Enercon part-owned the rail line, the company undertook large scale investments in its infrastructure In 2020 Enercon sold its rail ventures To Hermann Bettels GmbH.

Gallery

Estinnes windfarm

See also 
List of wind turbine manufacturers
Renewable energy industry
Wind power
Enercon E-126

References

External links 

Enercon's home page

Engineering companies of Germany
Wind power in Germany
Wind turbine manufacturers
Companies based in Lower Saxony
German brands
Multinational companies headquartered in Germany